A total solar eclipse occurred on Saturday, June 8, 1918. The eclipse was viewable across the entire contiguous United States, an event which would not occur again until the solar eclipse of August, 2017.

The path 

The path of totality started south of Japan, went across the Pacific Ocean, passing northern part of Kitadaitō, Okinawa and the whole Tori-shima in Izu Islands on June 9 (Sunday), and then acrossed the contiguous United States and British Bahamas (today's Bahamas) on June 8 (Saturday). The longest duration of totality was in the Pacific at a point south of Alaska. The path of the eclipse finished near Bermuda.

Besides the path where a total solar eclipse was visible, a partial solar eclipse was visible in the eastern part of East Asia, northern part of Northern Europe, eastern part of Micronesia, Hawaii Islands, northeastern Russian Empire, the entire North America except the Lesser Antilles, and the northwestern tip of South America.

U.S. Observation team 

The path of the eclipse clipped Washington state, and then moved across the whole of Oregon through the rest of the country, exiting over Florida. The U.S. Naval Observatory (USNO) obtained a special grant of $3,500 from Congress for a team to observe the eclipse in Baker City, Oregon. The team had been making preparations since the year before, and John C. Hammond led the first members to Baker City on April 11th. The location was important, as it influenced the probability of cloud cover and the duration and angle of the sun during the eclipse. The team included Samuel Alfred Mitchell as its expert on eclipses, and Howard Russell Butler, an artist and physicist. In a time before reliable colour photography, Butler's role was to paint the eclipse at totality after observing it for 112.1 seconds. He noted later that he used a system of taking notes of the colours using skills he had learned for transient effects.

Joel Stebbins and Jakob Kunz from the University of Illinois Observatory made the first photoelectric photometric observations of the solar corona from their observing site near Rock Springs, Wyoming

Observation 
As the total eclipse approached, the team watched as clouds obscured the sun. The clouds did clear, but during their most important observations the sun was covered by a thin cloud; the sun was completely visible five minutes later. This was not unusual, as cloudy conditions were reported across the country, where the eclipse was also observed from the Yerkes Observatory, Lick Observatory, and Mount Wilson Observatory.

Following the 1915 prediction of Albert Einstein's General theory of relativity that light would be deflected when passing near a massive object such as the sun, the USNO expedition attempted to validate Einstein's prediction by measuring the position of stars near the sun.  The cloud cover during totality obscured observations of stars, though, preventing this test of the validity of general relativity from being completed until the solar eclipse of May 29, 1919.

Related eclipses 

There were two other eclipses that year. The first was a partial lunar eclipse, during which the shadow of the earth can be seen on the moon, and another solar eclipse that took place on December 3 over South America. The other solar eclipse, however, was an annular eclipse, which occurs when the moon has a smaller apparent diameter and therefore never fully obscures the sun.

Solar eclipses of 1916–1920

Saros 126

Notes

Other links 
 NASA graphic
 Eclipse of June 8, 1918. Contact print from the original glass plate negative. Lick Observatory Plate Archive, Mt. Hamilton.
 Foto and sketch of Solar Corona June 8, 1918

1918 in science
1918 06 8
June 1918 events
1918 06 8